One of the most successful scouts in the ranks of the Federal army in Western Virginia, in the summer of 1861, was Jack (John) Cade of Marion County, Ohio, a private in Company K of the Fourth Ohio Volunteer Infantry.  Soon after the regiment arrived in that section, he began to develop qualities which attracted the attention first of Col. George Leonard Andrews, his regimental Commander, and finally of General George B. McClellan himself.  The latter then issued orders that "Jack" should be allowed to pass through the Federal lines, day or night, whenever he wished.  He used the privilege to good advantage several times, saving the Union troops from disastrous surprises.  As a successful scout did he become so annoying and so well known to the rebels that Confederate Col. Henry Marshall Ashby offered $500 for his scalp.  Jack, being anxious to see the male who was so anxious to get hold of his top knot, started out toward Petersburg, then held by the rebels, arriving at the house of a Union farmer by which Ashby was expected soon to pass.  He borrowed a suit of clothiers, a horse, and a scythe from the farmer and started up the road to meet said Ashby.  The latter came in sight, and Jack, with the scythe swung over his shoulder, stopped him and had a protracted conversation with him.  Several times during the interview Jack was tempted to shoot Ashby with his revolver, but he suffered him to depart in peace.

Jack learned, during the conversation, that two companies of Ashby's cavalry would soon pass along a certain road, and he collected a party of Union farmers, ambushed them, and killed eleven men and two horses.

When the Fourth Regiment was transferred to Shield's division and the division transferred to Banks' department, Jack went with it, of course.  He soon won the confidence of his new departmental commander and was again employed in collecting information of the movements of the enemy.  The last time he was sent out by Gen. Banks, he was accompanied by Richard Field, also of Marion, and as brave as Jack himself.  They were ordered to procure information of the situation of Gen. Ewell's camp.  They proceeded to a point on the Masanatten Mountain whence they could, by the aid of a splendid field-glass belonging to Col. Godman, obtain a full view of the rebel encampment.  After making a thorough sketch of it, they started for headquarters, Jack having his papers in his cap with his handkerchief over them.  On their way, they were suddenly surrounded by a number of Mississippi soldiers.  The officer in command ordered them to surrender, which they did, but when ordered to advance, Jack stopped, took off his cap, took out the handkerchief, gathering the papers in his hand with it, wiped his face, threw the handkerchief back deftly retaining the papers in his band, and, whilst advancing toward the officer, apparently by accident he stubbed his toe, fell down and ran his hand under the leaves and rubbish, leaving the papers there, and thus saving himself and comrade from being shot as spies.  They were then taken to Richmond, treated most inhumanly for eight or nine days, and finally paroled.

References

People of Ohio in the American Civil War
People from Marion, Ohio